The chapters of the Dorohedoro manga were written and illustrated by Q Hayashida. The series began in the first ever issue of Shogakukan's seinen manga magazine Spirits Zōkan Ikki (re-branded as Monthly Ikki in 2003), released on November 30, 2000. Monthly Ikki ceased publication on September 25, 2014, and the series was transferred to Monthly Ikkis magazine replacement Hibana, starting on March 6, 2015. Hibana ceased publication after a two-year run on August 7, 2017, and Dorohedoro was transferred to Shogakukan's shōnen manga magazine Monthly Shōnen Sunday on November 10 of the same year. The manga finished after eighteen years of publication on September 12, 2018, with its 167th chapter. Shogakukan has compiled the chapters into twenty-three tankōbon volumes, released from January 30, 2002, to November 12, 2018. A 14-page special chapter was published seventeen months after the series' finale in Monthly Shōnen Sunday on February 12, 2020.

In North America, Viz Media began distributing the manga digitally in 2009 when it launched its SigIKKI site, the former online English version of Monthly Ikki. The twenty-three volumes of Dorohedoro were released in print from March 16, 2010, to September 17, 2019. It was translated by the localization company AltJapan Co., Ltd., who has continued to translate all subsequent releases.



Volume list
Note: All chapters are labeled as "Spells".

References

Dorohedoro